Asen Lekarski (12 May 1901 – 2 September 1952) was a Bulgarian fencer. He competed in the individual sabre event at the 1928 Summer Olympics.

References

External links
Biography of Asen Lekarski 

1901 births
1952 deaths
Bulgarian male sabre fencers
Olympic fencers of Bulgaria
Fencers at the 1928 Summer Olympics